Nikolsburg (Yiddish: ניקאלשפורג) is the name of a Hasidic dynasty descending from Shmelke of Nikolsburg, a disciple of Dov Ber of Mezeritch. From 1773 to 1778 he was the Chief Rabbi of Moravia, in the city of Nikolsburg, from which the dynasty gets its name.

Nikolsburg lineage

Boston and Lelov 
 Shmuel Shmelke ha-Levi Horowitz (1726–1778), Chief Rabbi of Nikolsburg.
 Zevi Joshua Horowitz (1754–1816), Chief Rabbi of Jamnitz, Trebitsch, and Prossnitz. Son-in-law of his uncle Pinchas Horowitz. 
 Yaakov Dovid Horowitz (died 1855)
 Noach Pinchas Horowitz (died 1875), Chief Rabbi of Magierov.
 Alexsander Yitzchak Horowitz (1826–1886).
 Shmuel Shmelke Horowitz (1860–1898), rabbi in Jerusalem. 
 Pinchas David Horowitz (1876–1941), Founder of the Boston Hasidic dynasty. 
 David Tzvi Shlomo Biderman (1844–1918), Fourth rebbe of Lelov. Son-in-law of Noach Pinchas Horowitz. His great-grandson Pinchas Yitzchak Biderman (b. 1940), is the rebbe of Lelov-Nikolsburg.

Nikolsburg-Monsey 
 Baruch'l Schnitzler (died 1822), rabbi in Kaliv. Son-in-law of Zevi Joshua Horowitz.
 Yoel Schnitzler (died 1865), Chief Rabbi of Kotaj.
 Baruch Yehuda Schnitzler (1845-1894), Chief Rabbi of Derecske.
 Shragei Shmuel Shmelke Schnitzler (1889–1979), the Tchabe Rav.
 Baruch Yehuda Lebovitch (1909–1951), religious judge of Kish. Son-in-law of Shragei Shmuel Shmelke Schnitzler.
 Yosef Yechiel Mechel Lebovits (born 1947), rebbe of the Nikolsburg community in Monsey.

Mordechai Zev Jungreis 
Mordechai Zev Jungreis, a descendant of Mordecai Benet is also known as the Nikolsburger rebbe and is the rabbi of the B'nai Israel Synagogue in Woodbourne, New York.

External link 

 Website of the Nikolsburg rebbe of Monsey

References 

Hasidic dynasties
Hasidic Judaism in Europe
Jews and Judaism in Moravia
Margraviate of Moravia
Orthodox Judaism in the Czech Republic